is a railway station in the city of Nakatsugawa, Gifu Prefecture, Japan, operated by Central Japan Railway Company (JR Tōkai).

Lines

Layout
The station has one ground-level  side platform and one ground-level island platform connected by a footbridge. The station has a Midori no Madoguchi staffed ticket office.

Platforms

Adjacent stations

|-
!colspan=5|JR Central

All passenger trains stop at this station, including the Shinano limited express.

History
It was renamed to its present name on 1 June 1911. On 1 April 1987, it became part of JR Tōkai.

Passenger statistics
In fiscal 2014, the station was used by an average of 3432 passengers daily (boarding passengers only).

Bus routes
Kita-Ena Kotsu
For Kashimo General Office (At this bus stop, you are able to transfer onto Nohi Bus bound to Gero Station and Hida-Hagiwara Station)
For Mino-Sakamoto Station and Totetsu Ena Shako (At this bus stop, you are able to transfer onto Totetsu Bus bound to Ena Station)

Surrounding area
Nakatsugawa City Hall

See also
 List of Railway Stations in Japan

References

External links

  

Railway stations in Japan opened in 1902
Railway stations in Gifu Prefecture
Stations of Central Japan Railway Company
Chūō Main Line
Nakatsugawa, Gifu